Luras (Gallurese: Lùris) is a comune (municipality) in the Province of Sassari in the Italian region Sardinia, located about  north of Cagliari and about  west of Olbia.

Luras borders the following municipalities: Arzachena, Calangianus, Luogosanto, Sant'Antonio di Gallura, Tempio Pausania.

People
 Mavie Bardanzellu (born 1938), theater and film actress
 Roberto Diana (born 1983), musician, composer and producer

References

Cities and towns in Sardinia